Jacob Buzaglo (or Yaakov, ; born 1957) is a former Israeli footballer. He is also the father to four professional footballers, including Maor Buzaglo,  Almog Buzaglo, Asi Buzaglo and Ohad Buzaglo.

Honours

Club
Hapoel Tel Aviv
Israeli Premier League (1): 1980-81

Hapoel Lod F.C.
Israeli Second Division (1): 1981–82
Israeli State Cup (1): 1983-84
Israel Super Cup (1): 1984

Beitar Jerusalem
Israeli Premier League (1): 1986-87

References

External links
יעקב בוזגלו שוב תוקף

1957 births
Living people
Israeli Jews
Israeli footballers
Hapoel Jerusalem F.C. players
Hapoel Tel Aviv F.C. players
Hapoel Lod F.C. players
Beitar Jerusalem F.C. players
Liga Leumit players
Footballers from Jerusalem
Israeli people of Moroccan-Jewish descent
Israel international footballers
Association football midfielders